Samuel Edward Cooke (5 November 1883 – 23 May 1966) was an Australian rules footballer who played with Richmond in the Victorian Football League (VFL).

Notes

External links 

1883 births
1966 deaths
Australian rules footballers from Victoria (Australia)
Richmond Football Club players
People from Yarra Ranges